James Huskisson Crosby (3 July 1873 – 25 February 1960) was a South African international rugby union player. Born in Cape Town, he attended SACS before playing provincial rugby for Transvaal (now known as the Golden Lions). He made his only Test appearance for South Africa during Great Britain's 1896 tour. He played as a forward in the 2nd Test of the series, an 8–17 South Africa loss at the Wanderers Ground. Crosby died in 1960, in Johannesburg, at the age of 86.

References

South African rugby union players
South Africa international rugby union players
Rugby union forwards
1873 births
1960 deaths
Rugby union players from Cape Town
Golden Lions players